Pontypridd railway station serves the town of Pontypridd in Rhondda Cynon Taf, Wales. It is located at the junction of the Merthyr line and the Rhondda line and has for many years been the only station serving the town.

Until the 1930s, Pontypridd had two other stations. One, just behind the present station, was known as Pontypridd Graig. It closed in 1930. The other, Pontypridd Tram Road, serving the former Pontypridd to Newport line, closed in 1922. It was located near where this line crossed the 'Broadway' in Treforest.

History

Taff Vale Railway
The station was built by the Taff Vale Railway (TVR) and opened on 9 October 1840. It was known as Newbridge Junction until March 1866 when it was renamed Pontypridd.

It was progressively remodelled during the 19th century, but its present appearance derives largely from reconstruction carried out between 1907 and 1914. Reflecting both the narrow steep sided topography of the valley, and the need to accommodate many converging passenger routes and passing coal trains, it is effectively designed as two back-to-back termini. This gave it the then longest island platform in the world, around which were arranged seven platforms.

The west side of the island platform has two, stepped platform faces (originally platforms 1 & 2) each originally capable of accommodating a full-length train.  The east side of the island platform has three stepped platform faces (originally platforms 5, 6 & 7) arranged as a north bay platform, a through platform and a south bay platform. The north end of the island platform accommodated two bay platforms (originally platforms 3 & 4), now filled in.  The north end bay platforms were used for services to Aberdare, Nelson and Ynysybwl, and the south bay platform (originally platform 7) for services to Llantrisant and Cowbridge.

The modernisation of 2014/2015 brought former through platform 6 back into use as a bay platform, now numbered platform 1, for southbound services to Cardiff. (Due to loss of railway land to road widening, the southern end of the concourse of new bay platform 1 (old platform 6) has been cut back and re-profiled, and its track has been slewed partly into the adjacent trackbed of former bay platform 7.)

Architecturally, the 1912 station still includes all the original red brick and terracotta buildings on the island platform, some of which remain in public use, e.g. as ticket office and waiting room.  The elaborate 1912 main station façade in the same art nouveau style was destroyed during modernisation in the mid 1970s and replaced by a featureless red brick wall.  The station subsequently achieved Listed Building status in 1990 for architectural interest as a fine Edwardian railway station retaining original character. The 1970s façade was itself replaced by a mainly blue brick wall in the 1990s, temporarily exposing the severely damaged Edwardian façade.

Pontypridd, Caerphilly and Newport Railway
The Pontypridd, Caerphilly and Newport Railway (PC&NR) was opened for goods on 25 July 1884, providing a route to Newport Docks for Rhondda coal; the trains were worked by TVR locomotives. Passenger services, which used the TVR's station at Pontypridd, began on 28 December 1887, and were operated by the Alexandra (Newport and South Wales) Docks and Railway (ADR), which absorbed the PC&NR in 1897.

1911 accident

Also known as the Hopkinstown rail disaster, this accident occurred on 23 January 1911 when a passenger train collided with a coal train at Hopkinstown, outside Pontypridd, resulting in the loss of eleven lives.

Great Western Railway
The TVR and ADR amalgamated with the Great Western Railway on 1 January 1922, as did the Barry Railway, which also had a station in Pontypridd. To avoid confusion, the two stations were both renamed in 1924, the former TVR station becoming Pontypridd Central, with the ex-Barry Railway station becoming .

On 10 July 1930, Pontypridd Graig was closed, with its services being diverted to Pontypridd Central, which reverted to its former name of Pontypridd.

British Rail

With the Beeching Plan reducing passenger traffic (the line to Aberdare closing in March 1964), and falling coal production, track simplification was carried out by British Rail in 1974, resulting in the removal of all track from the eastern side of the island platform. Effectively, from 1974 onwards, the station functioned as a single-platform station (using old platform 1). However, with the subsequent re-opening of Aberdare and the growth of passenger traffic, British Rail added a new northbound platform in 1990–1991.  This platform was built alongside the former freight lines west of the main island platform, and did not form part of the original station.

Arrangements until December 2014
Two platforms were in use, only one of which (old platform 1) was located in the historic part of the large island platform station dating from 1912. Platform 1 was the southern one of two former platform faces on the west side of the long island platform. Accessible via a subway, it was used, and is still used, by Cardiff-bound services. The east side of the island platform once had three platform faces. This side of the station had lain out of use since the lifting of track in 1974. A booking office, a waiting room and toilets are located in original Edwardian brick and terracotta buildings on the main island platform, near Platform 1.

Platform 2 was a new platform for valleys-bound services built in 1990-1 alongside the former freight lines west of the main island platform. It was not part of the 1912 station. The platform shelter was built in brickwork laid in Flemish Bond, providing at least an attenuated echo of the station buildings on the main island platform. A new footbridge linked platforms 1 and 2.

On 27 August 2007, the station (along with all stations further up the valleys) was closed to enable work to be carried out to enable longer trains to be accommodated, starting with the new northbound platform. This closure continued until completion on 9 September.

During the summer of 2011 maintenance work was carried out at the station including work on the lift and restoration work on the canopy of the island platform. Ticket barriers were also installed.

Regeneration
As part of a £200m regeneration scheme to boost train capacity in Cardiff and the surrounding areas, Pontypridd received a third platform in December 2014.

Work began in 2014 to build this platform in the station, to accommodate more trains and to increase the number of services to Cardiff. The new platform is a bay platform that will bring part of the east side of the historic 1912 station back into use. The new bay platform has been formed from the former middle platform face on the east side of the station (former platform 6), necessarily re-profiled towards its southern end due to loss of land to road widening.

Since December 2014, platforms have been re-numbered as follows:

Platform 1 (pre-1974 platform 6): Bay platform for southbound services to Cardiff.
Platform 2 (platform 1 pre-1974 and 1974–2014): Through southbound services to Cardiff.
Platform 3 (freight line platform built in 1990-1 as platform 2): Through northbound services.

In October 2019, the station's underpass was repainted with help from Lionel Stanhope. The murals reflect vintage railway signs with 'Pontypridd' on one side and 'Graig' on the other. The project also brought improved lighting to the area.

Services 
This drops to hourly on each route in the evening.

In the evening there are three Cardiff-bound trains per hour.

A reduced service operates on Sundays, with two-hourly frequencies on all three northbound routes and three trains every two hours southbound to Cardiff and beyond.

Media
The station appeared in the television series Stella as Pontyberry. Other local stations including Barry Island railway station also appeared as Pontyberry in the series.

In 2020, the Rail Delivery Group nominated Pontypridd as one of the Welsh stations as a contender for the World Cup of Stations. However, it did not pass the group stages.

Gallery

References

External links

Railway stations in Rhondda Cynon Taf
DfT Category C2 stations
Former Taff Vale Railway stations
Railway stations in Great Britain opened in 1840
Railway stations served by Transport for Wales Rail
Pontypridd
Grade II listed buildings in Rhondda Cynon Taf
Grade II listed railway stations in Wales